Wallflower is a 1948 American comedy film directed by Frederick de Cordova, written by Henry Ephron and Phoebe Ephron adapted from the play of the same name by Reginald Denham and Mary Orr, and starring Robert Hutton, Joyce Reynolds, Janis Paige, Edward Arnold, Barbara Brown and Jerome Cowan. It was released by Warner Bros. on June 13, 1948.

Plot
Joy Linnett and her stepsister Jackie miss a flight home to Ohio, but the attractive Joy, accustomed to getting her way with men, flirts with pilot Stevie Wilson until he agrees to personally fly the two young women.

At home, old beau Warren James comes calling and invites Jackie to a country club's dance. As soon as Joy emerges in a swimsuit, the smitten Warren not only neglects Jackie, he invites her sister to the dance.

A quarrel ensues between the women's parents. Jackie's dad is outraged by the way his daughter is treated, but Joy's mom says he's just miffed that her daughter is more popular than his.

Stevie calls out of the blue, giving Jackie an idea. She emulates her sister's behavior and wardrobe, persuading Stevie to accompany her to the dance. Once there, all the men get a look at the new Jackie and line up to dance with her, as sister Joy looks on, delighted. Now it is Warren who is neglected, so much so that he gets drunk and proposes marriage to both sisters. In the end, he comes to appreciate that Jackie is the one he really loves.

Cast 
 Robert Hutton as Warren James
 Joyce Reynolds as Jackie Linnett
 Janis Paige as Joy Linnett
 Edward Arnold as Andrew J. Linnett
 Barbara Brown as Mrs. Jessie Linnett
 Jerome Cowan as Robert 'Bob' James
 Don McGuire as Stevie Wilson
 Ann Shoemaker as Mrs. Dixie James
 Lotte Stein as Minna the Housekeeper

Reception
T.M.P. of The New York Times reviewed the film positively, describing the plot and direction as unoriginal but praising the screenwriters for their adaptation of the original play and commenting positively on the acting.

References

External links 
 
 
 
 

1948 films
1948 comedy films
American comedy films
American films based on plays
Films directed by Frederick de Cordova
Films scored by Friedrich Hollaender
Warner Bros. films
American black-and-white films
1940s English-language films
1940s American films